Parkland Composite High School (PCHS) is a public high school located in Edson, Alberta, Canada. Parkland Composite High School offers various courses for grades 9 through 12 and is part of the Grande Yellowhead Public School Division No. 77. The school is also home to a French immersion program that provides grade 9 math and science courses in French and also has French Language Arts classes available for grades 9 through 12.

References

External links
Parkland Composite High School Website
Grande Yellowhead Public School Division No. 77 Website

Edson, Alberta
High schools in Alberta
Educational institutions established in 1968
1968 establishments in Alberta